In the physics of gauge theories, gauge fixing (also called choosing a gauge) denotes a mathematical procedure for coping with redundant degrees of freedom in field variables.  By definition, a gauge theory represents each physically distinct configuration of the system as an equivalence class of detailed local field configurations.  Any two detailed configurations in the same equivalence class are related by a gauge transformation, equivalent to a shear along unphysical axes in configuration space.  Most of the quantitative physical predictions of a gauge theory can only be obtained under a coherent prescription for suppressing or ignoring these unphysical degrees of freedom.

Although the unphysical axes in the space of detailed configurations are a fundamental property of the physical model, there is no special set of directions "perpendicular" to them.  Hence there is an enormous amount of freedom involved in taking a "cross section" representing each physical configuration by a particular detailed configuration (or even a weighted distribution of them).  Judicious gauge fixing can simplify calculations immensely, but becomes progressively harder as the physical model becomes more realistic; its application to quantum field theory is fraught with complications related to renormalization, especially when the computation is continued to higher orders.  Historically, the search for logically consistent and computationally tractable gauge fixing procedures, and efforts to demonstrate their equivalence in the face of a bewildering variety of technical difficulties, has been a major driver of mathematical physics from the late nineteenth century to the present.

Gauge freedom
The archetypical gauge theory is the Heaviside–Gibbs formulation of continuum electrodynamics in terms of an electromagnetic four-potential, which is presented here in space/time asymmetric Heaviside notation. The electric field E and magnetic field B of Maxwell's equations contain only "physical" degrees of freedom, in the sense that every mathematical degree of freedom in an electromagnetic field configuration has a separately measurable effect on the motions of test charges in the vicinity. These "field strength" variables can be expressed in terms of the electric scalar potential  and the magnetic vector potential A through the relations:

If the transformation

is made, then B remains unchanged, since (with the identity )

However, this transformation changes E according to

If another change

is made then E also remains the same.

A particular choice of the scalar and vector potentials is a gauge (more precisely, gauge potential) and a scalar function ψ used to change the gauge is called a gauge function. The existence of arbitrary numbers of gauge functions  corresponds to the U(1) gauge freedom of this theory. Gauge fixing can be done in many ways, some of which we exhibit below.

Although classical electromagnetism is now often spoken of as a gauge theory, it was not originally conceived in these terms.  The motion of a classical point charge is affected only by the electric and magnetic field strengths at that point, and the potentials can be treated as a mere mathematical device for simplifying some proofs and calculations.  Not until the advent of quantum field theory could it be said that the potentials themselves are part of the physical configuration of a system.  The earliest consequence to be accurately predicted and experimentally verified was the Aharonov–Bohm effect, which has no classical counterpart. Nevertheless, gauge freedom is still true in these theories. For example, the Aharonov–Bohm effect depends on a line integral of A around a closed loop, and this integral is not changed by 

Gauge fixing in non-abelian gauge theories, such as Yang–Mills theory and general relativity, is a rather more complicated topic; for details see Gribov ambiguity, Faddeev–Popov ghost, and frame bundle.

An illustration

As an illustration of gauge fixing, one may look at a cylindrical rod and attempt to tell whether it is twisted. If the rod is perfectly cylindrical, then the circular symmetry of the cross section makes it impossible to tell whether or not it is twisted. However, if there were a straight line drawn along the length of the rod, then one could easily say whether or not there is a twist by looking at the state of the line. Drawing a line is gauge fixing. Drawing the line spoils the gauge symmetry, i.e., the circular symmetry U(1) of the cross section at each point of the rod. The line is the equivalent of a gauge function; it need not be straight. Almost any line is a valid gauge fixing, i.e., there is a large gauge freedom. In summary, to tell whether the rod is twisted, the gauge must be known. Physical quantities, such as the energy of the torsion, do not depend on the gauge, i.e., they are gauge invariant.

Coulomb gauge
The Coulomb gauge (also known as the transverse gauge) is used in quantum chemistry and condensed matter physics and is defined by the gauge condition (more precisely, gauge fixing condition)

It is particularly useful for "semi-classical" calculations in quantum mechanics, in which the vector potential is quantized but the Coulomb interaction is not.

The Coulomb gauge has a number of properties:

Lorenz gauge

The Lorenz gauge is given, in SI units, by:

and in Gaussian units by:

This may be rewritten as:

where  is the electromagnetic four-potential, ∂μ the 4-gradient [using the metric signature (+, −, −, −)].

It is unique among the constraint gauges in retaining manifest Lorentz invariance. Note, however, that this gauge was originally named after the Danish physicist Ludvig Lorenz and not after Hendrik Lorentz; it is often misspelled "Lorentz gauge". (Neither was the first to use it in calculations; it was introduced in 1888 by George F. FitzGerald.)

The Lorenz gauge leads to the following inhomogeneous wave equations for the potentials:

It can be seen from these equations that, in the absence of current and charge, the solutions are potentials which propagate at the speed of light.

The Lorenz gauge is incomplete in some sense: There remains a subspace of gauge transformations which can also preserve the constraint. These remaining degrees of freedom correspond to gauge functions which satisfy the wave equation

These remaining gauge degrees of freedom propagate at the speed of light.  To obtain a fully fixed gauge, one must add boundary conditions along the light cone of the experimental region.

Maxwell's equations in the Lorenz gauge simplify to 

where  is the four-current.

Two solutions of these equations for the same current configuration differ by a solution of the vacuum wave equation 

In this form it is clear that the components of the potential separately satisfy the Klein–Gordon equation, and hence that the Lorenz gauge condition allows transversely, longitudinally, and "time-like" polarized waves in the four-potential.  The transverse polarizations correspond to classical radiation, i.e., transversely polarized waves in the field strength.  To suppress the "unphysical" longitudinal and time-like polarization states, which are not observed in experiments at classical distance scales, one must also employ auxiliary constraints known as Ward identities.  Classically, these identities are equivalent to the continuity equation 

Many of the differences between classical and quantum electrodynamics can be accounted for by the role that the longitudinal and time-like polarizations play in interactions between charged particles at microscopic distances.

Rξ gauges
The Rξ gauges are a generalization of the Lorenz gauge applicable to theories expressed in terms of an action principle with Lagrangian density . Instead of fixing the gauge by constraining the gauge field a priori, via an auxiliary equation, one adds a gauge breaking term to the "physical" (gauge invariant) Lagrangian

The choice of the parameter ξ determines the choice of gauge. The Landau gauge is classically equivalent to Lorenz gauge: it is obtained in the limit ξ → 0  but postpones taking that limit until after the theory has been quantized. It improves the rigor of certain existence and equivalence proofs.

An equivalent formulation of Rξ gauge uses an auxiliary field, a scalar field B with no independent dynamics:

The auxiliary field, sometimes called a Nakanishi–Lautrup field, can be eliminated by "completing the square" to obtain the previous form.  From a mathematical perspective the auxiliary field is a variety of Goldstone boson, and its use has advantages when identifying the asymptotic states of the theory, and especially when generalizing beyond QED.

Historically, the use of Rξ gauges was a significant technical advance in extending quantum electrodynamics computations beyond one-loop order. In addition to retaining manifest Lorentz invariance, the Rξ prescription breaks the symmetry under local gauge transformations while preserving the ratio of functional measures of any two physically distinct gauge configurations.  This permits a change of variables in which infinitesimal perturbations along "physical" directions in configuration space are entirely uncoupled from those along "unphysical" directions, allowing the latter to be absorbed into the physically meaningless normalization of the functional integral.  When ξ is finite, each physical configuration (orbit of the group of gauge transformations) is represented not by a single solution of a constraint equation but by a Gaussian distribution centered on the extremum of the gauge breaking term. In terms of the Feynman rules of the gauge-fixed theory, this appears as a contribution to the photon propagator for internal lines from virtual photons of unphysical polarization.

The photon propagator, which is the multiplicative factor corresponding to an internal photon in the Feynman diagram expansion of a QED calculation, contains a factor gμν corresponding to the Minkowski metric.  An expansion of this factor as a sum over photon polarizations involves terms containing all four possible polarizations. Transversely polarized radiation can be expressed mathematically as a sum over either a linearly or circularly polarized basis. Similarly, one can combine the longitudinal and time-like gauge polarizations to obtain "forward" and "backward" polarizations; these are a form of light-cone coordinates in which the metric is off-diagonal. An expansion of the gμν factor in terms of circularly polarized (spin ±1) and light-cone coordinates is called a spin sum. Spin sums can be very helpful both in simplifying expressions and in obtaining a physical understanding of the experimental effects associated with different terms in a theoretical calculation.

Richard Feynman used arguments along approximately these lines largely to justify calculation procedures that produced consistent, finite, high precision results for important observable parameters such as the anomalous magnetic moment of the electron. Although his arguments sometimes lacked mathematical rigor even by physicists' standards and glossed over details such as the derivation of Ward–Takahashi identities of the quantum theory, his calculations worked, and Freeman Dyson soon demonstrated that his method was substantially equivalent to those of Julian Schwinger and Sin-Itiro Tomonaga, with whom Feynman shared the 1965 Nobel Prize in Physics.

Forward and backward polarized radiation can be omitted in the asymptotic states of a quantum field theory (see Ward–Takahashi identity). For this reason, and because their appearance in spin sums can be seen as a mere mathematical device in QED (much like the electromagnetic four-potential in classical electrodynamics), they are often spoken of as "unphysical". But unlike the constraint-based gauge fixing procedures above, the Rξ gauge generalizes well to non-abelian gauge groups such as the SU(3) of QCD. The couplings between physical and unphysical perturbation axes do not entirely disappear under the corresponding change of variables; to obtain correct results, one must account for the non-trivial Jacobian of the embedding of gauge freedom axes within the space of detailed configurations. This leads to the explicit appearance of forward and backward polarized gauge bosons in Feynman diagrams, along with Faddeev–Popov ghosts, which are even more "unphysical" in that they violate the spin–statistics theorem. The relationship between these entities, and the reasons why they do not appear as particles in the quantum mechanical sense, becomes more evident in the BRST formalism of quantization.

Maximal Abelian gauge
In any non-Abelian gauge theory, any maximal Abelian gauge is an incomplete gauge which fixes the gauge freedom outside of the maximal Abelian subgroup. Examples are
For SU(2) gauge theory in D dimensions, the maximal Abelian subgroup is a U(1) subgroup. If this is chosen to be the one generated by the Pauli matrix σ3, then the maximal Abelian gauge is that which maximizes the function  where 
For SU(3) gauge theory in D dimensions, the maximal Abelian subgroup is a U(1)×U(1) subgroup. If this is chosen to be the one generated by the Gell-Mann matrices λ3 and λ8, then the maximal Abelian gauge is that which maximizes the function  where 

This applies regularly in higher algebras (of groups in the algebras), for example the Clifford Algebra and as it is regularly.

Less commonly used gauges

Various other gauges, which can be beneficial in specific situations have appeared in the literature.

Weyl gauge
The Weyl gauge (also known as the Hamiltonian or temporal gauge) is an incomplete gauge obtained by the choice

It is named after Hermann Weyl.  It eliminates the negative-norm ghost, lacks manifest Lorentz invariance, and requires longitudinal photons and a constraint on states.

Multipolar gauge
The gauge condition of the multipolar gauge (also known as the line gauge, point gauge or Poincaré gauge (named after Henri Poincaré)) is:

This is another gauge in which the potentials can be expressed in a simple way in terms of the instantaneous fields

Fock–Schwinger gauge
The gauge condition of the Fock–Schwinger gauge (named after Vladimir Fock and Julian Schwinger; sometimes also called the relativistic Poincaré gauge) is:

where xμ is the position four-vector.

Dirac gauge
The nonlinear Dirac gauge condition (named after Paul Dirac) is:

References

Further reading

Electromagnetism
Quantum field theory
Quantum electrodynamics
Gauge theories

pl:Cechowanie (fizyka)#Wybór cechowania